The Blue Metropolis Violet Prize is a Canadian literary award, presented to an established LGBTQ writer to honour their body of work. Created by the Blue Metropolis literary festival in Montreal, Quebec, as part of its LGBTQ-themed Violet Metropolis series, the award was created in 2018 and will alternate between English language and French language writers.

The award was created as a complement, rather than competition, to the Dayne Ogilvie Prize, which honours emerging Canadian LGBTQ writers. The award's corporate sponsor is Air Canada.

Winners
2018 - Nicole Brossard
2019 - Dionne Brand
2020 - Festival cancelled due to the COVID-19 pandemic in Canada; award not presented.
2021 - André Roy
2022 - Tomson Highway

References

Awards established in 2018
Canadian literary awards
LGBT literary awards
LGBT literature in Canada
2018 establishments in Quebec